Lower Holker is a civil parish in the South Lakeland District of Cumbria, England.  It contains 62 listed buildings that are recorded in the National Heritage List for England.  Of these, five are listed at Grade II*, the middle of the three grades, and the others are at Grade II, the lowest grade.  The parish contains the villages of Flookburgh and Cark, and the country house of Holker Hall with its grounds, and is otherwise rural.  The hall and items in its grounds are listed.  Most of the other listed buildings are in the villages, and most of these are houses and associated structures.  Other listed buildings include farmhouses and farm buildings, bridges, a public house, a railway footbridge, a former school, a drinking trough, a market cross, a war memorial, and a church.


Key

Buildings

References

Citations

Sources

Lists of listed buildings in Cumbria